Euonyma is a genus of small tropical air-breathing land snails, terrestrial pulmonate gastropod mollusks in the family Achatinidae.

Species 
The genus Euonyma includes:
 Euonyma curtissima Verdcourt
 Euonyma laeocochlis (Melvill & Ponsonby, 1896) - type species

References 

 
Taxonomy articles created by Polbot